Academic cantatas are two cantatas for university graduation ceremonies by Jean Sibelius. He composed a Cantata for the University Graduation Ceremonies of 1894, and a Cantata for the University Graduation Ceremonies of 1897, both scored for soprano, baritone, mixed chorus, and orchestra. One movement of the 1894 work was published as Juhlamarssi. Only the vocal score of the 1897 work survived, published as Nine Songs for Chorus, Op. 23.

Cantata for the University Graduation Ceremonies of 1894 
Sibelius composed the cantata, JS 105, setting a text by Kasimir Lönnbohm (or Leino), in the spring of 1894. His homophonic composition remained unpublished, only a march movement was published as Juhlamarssi.

Cantata for the University Graduation Ceremonies of 1897 
Sibelius based a second cantata for graduation ceremonies, JS 106, based on words by A. V. Forsman. Only the vocal score of the work survived. The movements were published as a collection of songs, Nine Songs for Chorus, Op. 23.

Songs 
Nine songs from the Cantata for the Graduate and Master's Degree Ceremony of 1897 were published for mixed choir:

  (O love)
  (O precious Finland)

Literature 
 Tomi Mäkelä: "Jean Sibelius und seine Zeit" (German), Laaber-Verlag, Regensburg 2013

References

External links 
 

Cantatas
Compositions by Jean Sibelius
1894 compositions
1897 compositions